New Radnor was, from 1894 to 1974, a rural district in the administrative county of Radnorshire, Wales.

The district was formed by the Local Government Act 1894, when the existing Kington Rural Sanitary District was divided into two: the section in Herefordshire was reconstituted as Kington Rural District, while the section in Radnorshire became New Radnor Rural District. The new district took its name from the village of New Radnor, at one time a borough and county town of Radnorshire. The council continued to be based in Kington in Herefordshire.

The rural district comprised fifteen civil parishes: 

Colva
Ednol
Evenjobb
Gladestry
Glascwm
Harpton and Wolfpits
Kinnerton, Salford and Badland
Llandeglau
Llanfihangel Nant Melan
Michaelchurch on Arrow
New Radnor
Newchurch
Old Radnor and Burlingjobb
Trewern and Gwailtha
Walton and Womaston

The district was abolished in 1974 under the Local Government Act 1972, which completely reorganised local administration in England and Wales. Its area became part of the District of Radnor in the new county of Powys.

References

Rural districts of Wales
History of Radnorshire
Radnorshire